Jeanie is a feminine given name in the English language.

People with the given name

Jeanie Buss, president of the Los Angeles Lakers
Jeanie Deans (disambiguation)
Jeanie Johnson
Jeanie Lee, known as Gin Lee, Malaysian singer
Jeanie MacPherson

Fictional characters
Jeanie Humphrey-Dawson, a character in the 1994 American television comedy film Revenge of the Nerds IV: Nerds in Love

See also
Aechmea 'Jeanie', a flowering plant

Jean (disambiguation)
Jeannie (given name)

English feminine given names
English-language feminine given names